The International Order of Characters  (IOC) is an organization dedicated to improving the fields of Aviation and Aerospace. The IOC also provides financial assistance to persons and organizations in fields related to Aviation and other technology industries.

History
In the South Pacific theater, in the early days of World War II, a United States Army Air Forces flight surgeon, Captain James E. Crane, organized a group of American and Allied pilots under his care into a fraternal order that came to be called the International Order of Characters. At their induction into the order, each member received a private nickname known only to the other members. The private nicknames soon became public call-signs for the aviators as they recovered and returned to the war. By 1943, the IOC had grown to nearly one thousand members, but activity in the order stopped when Crane was reassigned to the United States.

In the early 1950s, Dr. Crane, then a flight examiner for the Federal Aviation Administration, reactivated the IOC at the urging of former members. The reborn IOC became an education foundation that provided scholarships and grants to children of deceased or disabled pilots as well as to former members of the armed forces who studied for a degree in aviation-related fields of research.

Publications
The order publishes the IOC Memorial Log commemorating those friends, family, or IOC members that have died. The Memorial Log is presented at every meeting of the IOC.

Conferences
The IOC typically hosts two meeting a year—an aviation symposium in the spring and a meeting in the fall. These events have been held at locations throughout the world.

Awards
During its annual meetings, the IOC recognizes aviation personalities and aviation achievement with the following trophies. The IOC trophies are awarded on the basis of achievement in aviation, aerospace and associated fields of activity. Recipients are not required to be IOC members.

Aero Space Trophy Award
Recipients of the IOC Aero Space Trophy Award include:

 1964—Joseph Walker
 1965—James McDivitt
 1966—Robert Rushworth
 1967—William "Pete" Knight
 1969—Igor Sikorsky
 1970—Jerauld Gentry
 1971—John Stack
 1972—Walter Schirra, Jr.
 1973—William P. Lear
 1981—Paul Tibbets
 1982—Jack Hall
 1983—Bob Stephens
 1984—Neil Anderson
 1991—Kenneth L. Tallman
 1995—Barry Goldwater
 1996—Charles H. Kaman
 1997—Jeffery L. Ethell

Character of the Year Award
Recipients of the IOC Character of the Year Award include:

 1962—Roscoe Turner
 1963—Barry Goldwater
 1964—Adm. Daniel F. Smith
 1965—Maj. Gen. C.L. Mullins
 1966—V. Adm. C.E. Rosendahl
 1967—James E. Crane
 1969—Herman Salmon
 1970—R. Adm. George Dufek
 1971—Takofumi Hishikari
 1972—Sergei Sikorsky
 1973—John M. Conroy
 1974—Joseph U. Greely
 1975—Joseph Higgins
 1976—Clifford Henderson
 1977—Jack Garfield
 1979—John Boren
 1980—Douglas Moody
 1982—Vincent O'Toole
 1983—Henry J. Esposito
 1985—John E. Bach
 1986—Bruce Tingle
 1987—J. Sheldon Lewis
 1988—Fred E. Muhl
 1989—Richard G. Paul
 1990—Max Feibelman
 1992—Adriane Gladstone
 1993—Jerome P. Ashfield
 1995—Armand S. Toron
 2000—Alton G. Hudson
 2002—Donald J. Rauch

Pilot of the Year Award
Recipients of the IOC Pilot of the Year Award include:

 1954—Col. Leon W. Gray
 1955—Capt. Cassmier S. Szmagaj
 1956—Capt. Edward W. Kinsley
 1957—Capt. Ned Avary
 1958—Capt. Page Smith
 1959—Capt. S.G. Wood
 1960—Capt. Charles Tennsted
 1961—General Adolf Galland
 1961—Robert Stanford Tuck
 1962—Scott Crossfield
 1963—Herbet O. Fisher
 1964—Capt. Marius Lodeesen
 1965—Gen James Steinoff
 1966—Brig. Gen. Robin Olds
 1967—Col. Joseph Cotton
 1969—A.W. "Tony" LeVier
 1970—Col. Francis Gabreski
 1971—Prince Bernard
 1972—Reitsch-Flagkapitan Hanna Reitsch
 1973—Col. Joseph Kittinger
 1974—Adm. F.H. Michaelis
 1975—H.T. "Dick" Merrill
 1976—Arthur Godfrey
 1977—Capt. Charles Mathews
 1978—Capt. Kimball Scribner
 1979—Capt. Roy Simpkins
 1980—David E. Coffman
 1981—Capt. Joseph Grant
 1982—Mrs. Siggy Silkorsky
 1983—Bob Hoover
 1984—Jack Doswell
 1985—Con Rodewald
 1986—Capt. John Testrake
 1987—Jeana Yeager and Dick Rutan
 1988—H. Clay Lacy
 1989—Michael Graham
 1990—Maj. Gen. Leigh Wade
 1991—George Haddaway
 1992—Albert Bayer
 1993—Ann Lindbergh
 1994—Capt. Eric Brown
 1997—Rudy Opitz
 1998—J. Stephen Fossett
 1999—Col. Eugene P. Deatrick
 2000—Johnson M. Taylor
 2001—Raymond L. Hunicke

Scholarship fund
The IOC Scholarship Fund provides educational assistance to the descendants of pilots and to those pursuing careers in aviation or related industries. The IOC also provides funding to organizations that issue individual scholarships to deserving candidates in fields related to aviation and other technology industries.

Notable members
The following is an incomplete list of notable individuals who are or were members of the IOC. If available, the individual's IOC nickname is also shown.

 Douglas Bader
 Charles Bassett, Boom Boom
 Prince Bernhard of Lippe-Biesterfeld, HRH The Lion
 Eric Brown, Winkle
 Scott Crossfield, Rocket
 Bill Dana, Jose
 Eugene P. Deatrick, Bismark
 Jimmy Doolittle
 George J. Dufek, Penguin
 Louis Ferdinand, Prince of Prussia
 Steve Fossett, Cucumber
 Gabby Gabreski, Gabby
 Adolf Galland, The Red Knight
 Jerauld R. Gentry, Flying Bathtub
 Arthur Godfrey, Bunkie
 Barry Goldwater, Gold Dust
 Richard P. Hallion, Memory Bank
 Bob Hoover, Mustang
 Dietrich Hrabak
 Charles H. Kaman, Pres. Kaman Aircraft
 Joseph Kittinger, The Jump
 William J. Knight, Lickety Split
 Clay Lacy, Racey
 Bill Lear, King Lear
 Tony LeVier, Lightning
 James McDivitt, Gemini Cricket
 Dick Merrill, Old Ping Pong Balls
 Robin Olds, Phantom
 Günther Rall
 Hanna Reitsch, Supersonic Sue
 Robert Rushworth, North Star
 Burt Rutan
 Herman Salmon, Fish
 Walter Schirra, Jr., Sky Ray
 Robert Lee Scott, Jr., Shoe Clerk
 Igor Sikorsky, Winged S
 Johannes Steinhoff
 Robert L. Stephens, The Silver Fox II
 Kenneth L. Tallman, Iron Wind
 Paul Tibbets, Big Bang
 Robert Stanford Tuck, Spitfire
 Roscoe Turner, The Roar
 Joseph Walker, Mach 7

References

External links
IOC Homepage
https://web.archive.org/web/20120227142101/http://www.iocaviation.org/History_2.html

Aviation organizations
Fraternal orders